James Duckworth (born 9 April 1994) is an English professional rugby league footballer who played on the  for the Hunslet Hawks in Kingstone Press League 1.

Duckworth came through the Leeds Rhinos Academy. He played for the Leeds Rhinos, and the London Broncos in the Super League.

He has spent time on loan at Hunslet and the Featherstone Rovers.

References

External links
Hunslet Hawks profile
Leeds Rhinos profile

1994 births
Living people
English rugby league players
Featherstone Rovers players
Hunslet R.L.F.C. players
Leeds Rhinos players
London Broncos players
Rugby league players from Leeds
Rugby league wingers